Martin Eugene Bystrom (born July 26, 1958), is an American former professional baseball pitcher, who played for the Philadelphia Phillies and New York Yankees in Major League Baseball from 1980 to 1985.

Bystrom attended Miami Killian Senior High School and then Miami Dade Community College where he was signed by the Phillies as an amateur free agent in December 1976. At age 22, as a September call-up, he made his MLB debut on September 7, 1980; Bystrom went on to win 5 games (including a complete-game shutout) that September, en route to Philadelphia's National League East Division championship.

Until Dylan Lee's start for the Atlanta Braves in the 2021 World Series, Bystrom set a record in 1980 for fewest regular season appearances (6) before making a start in a World Series.

On June 30, 1984, the Phillies traded Bystrom, along with Keith Hughes to the Yankees for pitcher Shane Rawley.

Following the 1985 season, Bystrom was granted free agency and was re-signed by the Yankees. However, he would never again reach the big leagues, as he finished his career pitching in the farm systems of the Yankees, San Francisco Giants, Phillies, and Cleveland Indians, eventually retiring as an active player in 1989. Because the 1994 MLB players' strike also affected 1995 spring training, he briefly attempted a comeback as a replacement player because, "No matter what, there's nothing quite so special as putting on a major-league uniform and playing baseball. I cherish this. I always did."

References

External links

Marty Bystrom at Baseball Almanac

1958 births
Major League Baseball pitchers
Baseball players from Florida
Philadelphia Phillies players
New York Yankees players
Reading Phillies players
Albany-Colonie Yankees players
Spartanburg Phillies players
Prince William Yankees players
Oklahoma City 89ers players
Colorado Springs Sky Sox players
Columbus Clippers players
Phoenix Firebirds players
Maine Phillies players
Portland Beavers players
Living people
Sportspeople from Coral Gables, Florida